Dr. Becky may refer to:

 Becky Smethurst, British astrophysicist and YouTuber
 Rebecca Allison, American cardiologist and transgender activist